Apeksha Patil is a politician of the Shiv Sena party in Thane district, Maharashtra. She is the current Mayor of Ulhasnagar Municipal Corporation.

Positions held
 2012: Elected as corporator in Ulhasnagar Municipal Corporation 
 2015: Elected as Mayor of Ulhasnagar Municipal Corporation

References

External links
 Shivsena Home Page
 umc.gov.in

Living people
Marathi politicians
Maharashtra politicians
Shiv Sena politicians
People from Thane district
Year of birth missing (living people)